ICEM can refer to:

 the International Federation of Chemical, Energy, Mine and General Workers' Unions
 the International Organization for Migration, previously known as the Intergovernmental Committee for European Migration
 the International Conference on Emergency Medicine
 the International Council for Educational Media